Zdenko Muf (Serbian Cyrillic: Зденко Муф; born 21 July 1971) is a Serbian football manager and former player.

Playing career
Born in Smederevska Palanka, Muf started out at his local club Mladost Goša, before moving to Radnički Beograd still as a junior. He spent five years at the club, making his First League of FR Yugoslavia debut in the 1992–93 season. Alongside his teammate Vladan Milojević, Muf moved abroad in the summer of 1993, signing with Greek club PAS Giannina. He was the Beta Ethniki top scorer with 29 goals from 33 appearances in the 1993–94 season. Subsequently, together with Milojević, Muf was transferred to Kalamata, helping the club win promotion to the top flight in 1995. He made his Alpha Ethniki debut in the 1995–96 season, before being loaned out to his former club PAS Giannina.

In the summer of 1996, Muf moved to Spain and joined Segunda División side Badajoz. He failed to make an impact at the club, before moving back to Greece for a six-month spell at Panelefsiniakos. In the summer of 1997, Muf moved to Mexican side Estudiantes Tecos. He spent the following four years at the club, becoming one of the league's best foreign players. Muf also played for Club León in the Invierno 2001, before returning to Estudiantes Tecos.

In the summer of 2002, Muf returned to Greece and joined his former club PAS Giannina. He eventually left the club in the spring of 2003, as they struggled financially. After returning to his homeland, Muf subsequently decided to retire from active play due to a lack of motivation and satisfying offers. He is a real idol for the fans of PAS Giannina in Greece.

Post-playing career
After several years hiatus, Muf became manager of GFK Jasenica 1911, being in charge of the club between 2011 and 2013. He then led Mladi Radnik from July 2013 to April 2014, before returning to GFK Jasenica 1911.

Career statistics

References

External links
 
 
 His goals for Tecos at Youtube
 His goals for PAS Giannina at Youtube

Association football forwards
CD Badajoz players
Club León footballers
Tecos F.C. footballers
Expatriate footballers in Greece
Expatriate footballers in Mexico
Expatriate footballers in Spain
FK Radnički Beograd players
Football League (Greece) players
Kalamata F.C. players
Liga MX players
PAS Giannina F.C. players
People from Smederevska Palanka
Segunda División players
Serbia and Montenegro expatriate footballers
Serbia and Montenegro footballers
Serbia and Montenegro expatriate sportspeople in Greece
Serbia and Montenegro expatriate sportspeople in Mexico
Serbia and Montenegro expatriate sportspeople in Spain
Serbian football managers
Serbian footballers
Super League Greece players
1971 births
Living people
Panelefsiniakos F.C. players